Zamboanga del Norte's 2nd congressional district is one of the three congressional districts of the Philippines in the province of Zamboanga del Norte. It has been represented in the House of Representatives since 1987. The district consists of the provincial capital city of Dipolog and adjacent municipalities of Jose Dalman, Katipunan, Manukan, President Manuel A. Roxas, Siayan and Sindangan. It is currently represented in the 19th Congress by Glona Labadlabad of PDP–Laban.

Representation history

Election results

2022

2019

2016

2013

2010

See also
Legislative districts of Zamboanga del Norte

References

Congressional districts of the Philippines
Politics of Zamboanga del Norte
1987 establishments in the Philippines
Congressional districts of Zamboanga Peninsula
Constituencies established in 1987